Woodstock 1994 is a live album by the American punk rock band Green Day. The album was released specially through Record Store Day on April 13, 2019, in honor of the 50th anniversary of Woodstock and the 25th anniversary of the now-famous set the band played at Woodstock '94. This was the first live Green Day album to feature the entire setlist.

Background 
Green Day played the Woodstock festival on the South Stage on August 14, 1994, 6 months after their first major-label album Dookie was released.  The performance was one of the most memorable of the festival, with the band getting involved in a mud fight with their fans. Tré Cool said of the event: "It was a crazy set – a set that changed our whole lives." On March 1, 2019, the band announced on their Instagram, "Look at that! Woodstock 1994 Live (remixed + remastered) drops on vinyl for the first time ever this Record Store Day. No better way to celebrate 50 years of Woodstock and the 25th anniversary of when we got a little muddy."

Album cover
The album cover was created by Billie Joe Armstrong. The cover photo features the same image from the band's 1994 album Dookie, but with duct tape over the cover, splattered with mud and written on. The band name on top of the mushroom cloud is covered by a piece of duct tape with "Green Day Live!" written on it, the monkey on the bottom left is wearing sunglasses, four of the missiles are saying "Never Trust a Hippy" and the word "Dookie" is covered by another piece of duct tape, with "Woodstock 1994" written on it.

Notes on performance
Woodstock '94 has also been referred to as Mudstock, or Mudstock '94, partly due to the rainy weather that resulted in mud pits; the band Nine Inch Nails performed covered in mud, and the crowd threw mud onto the stage when Primus performed "My Name Is Mud". During Green Day's performance, the crowd also started to pelt the stage with mud, some of which hit the guitarist and lead vocalist Billie Joe Armstrong. Armstrong then started a mud fight during their song, "Paper Lanterns", with the crowd. Bassist Mike Dirnt was mistaken for one of the fans jumping on stage and was spear-tackled by a security guard, knocking out one of his teeth. It was this incident that caused Dirnt to need emergency orthodontia. A gag order was put in place regarding this incident. In spite of the now-famous mud-fight and Dirnt's injury, Woodstock quickly propelled Green Day's then-recently released album, Dookie, into success.

Track listing 
All lyrics written by Billie Joe Armstrong; all music composed by Green Day.

Personnel
Green Day
Billie Joe Armstrong – guitar, lead vocals
Mike Dirnt – bass guitar, backing vocals
Tré Cool – drums

Production
Green Day – producer
Chris Dugan – producer

Charts

References

2019 live albums
Green Day albums
Record Store Day releases
Woodstock Festival